Atletica  is a Mexican sports equipment manufacturer. It was the official sponsor of the Mexican Olympic team from 2000 to 2012 and had previously sponsored several football clubs in the Mexican Primera División. In 2002, Atletica was the sponsor of the Mexico national football team in the 2002 FIFA World Cup.

Football teams sponsored
  Neza FC
  Correcaminos UAT
  Mexico Olympic Team (until 2012)

Past teams
Since its inception into the sporting market, Atletica has also manufactured kits for national sides for such as:

National teams

 Belize (2003–06)
 Bolivia (2000–05)
 Costa Rica (2000–01)
 El Salvador (2003, 2005, 2008)
 Guatemala (2001–04)
 Mexico (2000–02)
 Trinidad and Tobago (2000)
 Venezuela (2000–05)

Club teams

 Dallas Burn (2001–04)
 Colorado Rapids (2003–04)
 New England Revolution (2000)
 Montreal Impact
 C.D. Saprissa (2000–03)
 Liga Deportiva Alajuelense
* Unión de Curtidores (1998–99)

* Toluca FC (2000–10)

 Correcaminos UAT (2000)
 Santos Laguna (2000–10)
 Alacranes de Durango (1999–2000)
 Real Sociedad de Zacatecas (2002–03) (2)
 Chivas de Guadalajara (1998–2003)
 Leones Negros
 Atlas (1995–2001 & 2007–2012)
 Dorados de Sinaloa (2004)
 Pachuca (1997–2004)
 Atlante (2008–10)
 León (1997–2004)
 Tigres UANL (1999–2006)
 Tecos (2002–07)
 C.F. Monterrey (1999–2007)
 Indios (2006–07)
 CD Veracruz (2007–09)
 Club Puebla (1999–2010)
 Club Tijuana (2004–10)

Personalities

 Several Times World Champion Professional Boxer Erik "Terrible" Morales (2004)
 Professional Goalkeeper, Twice CONCACAF Gold Cup holder Oswaldo Sánchez (2005)
 LPGA Champion Professional Golfer Lorena Ochoa (2004)
 Kart, Indy & NASCAR Professional Racer Adrian Fernández (Early 2000s)
* Professional F1 Racer Sergio "Checo" Pérez (2012)

International Alliance

* NFL Dallas Cowboys (2003)
  Costa Rica Olympic Committee    Rio 2016

References

Notes
(2) This team is defunct.

Sportswear brands
Clothing companies established in 1995
Mexican brands
Sporting goods manufacturers of Mexico
Athletic shoe brands